National memory is a form of collective memory defined by shared experiences and culture. It is an integral part to national identity.

It represents one specific form of cultural memory, which makes an essential contribution to national group cohesion. Historically national communities have drawn upon commemorative ceremonies and monuments, myths and rituals, glorified individuals, objects, and events in their own history to produce a common narrative.

According to Lorraine Ryan, national memory is based on the public's reception of national historic narratives and the ability of people to affirm the legitimacy of these narratives.

Conflicting versions, dynamicity, manipulation and subjectivity
National memory typically consists of a shared interpretation of a nation's past. Such interpretations can vary and sometimes compete. They can get challenged and augmented by a range of interest groups, fighting to have their histories acknowledged, documented and commemorated and reshape national stories. Often national memory is adjusted to offer a politicized vision of the past to make a political position appear consistent with national identity. Furthermore, it profoundly affects how historical facts are perceived and recorded and may circumvent or appropriate facts. A repertoire of discursive strategies functions to emotionalize national narrative and nationalize personal pasts.

National memory has been used calculatedly by governments for dynastic, political, religious and cultural purposes since as early as the sixteenth century.

Marketing of memory by the culture industry and its instrumentalisation for political purposes can both be seen as serious threats to the objective understanding of a nation's past.

Lorraine Ryan notes that individual memory both shapes and is shaped by national memory, and that there is a competition between the dominant and individual memories of a nation.

Hyung Park states that the nation is continuously revived, re-imagined, reconstituted, through shared memories among its citizens.

National memories may also conflict with the other nations' collective memory.

Role of the media
Reports that are narrated in terms of national memory characterize the past in ways that merge the past, the present and the future into "a single ongoing tale".

Pierre Nora argues that a "democratisation of history" allows for emancipatory versions of the past to surface:

However, national history being passed on by the culture industry, such as by historical films, can be seen as serious threats to the objective understanding of a nation's past.

International media

Nations' memories can be shared across nations via media such as the Internet (through social media and other means of widespread communication)and news outlets.

Effects and functions 
National memory can be a force of cohesion as well as division and conflict. It can foster constructive national reforms, international communities and agreements, dialogue as well as deepen problematic courses and rhetoric.

Identity crisis can occur in a country due to large-scale negative events such as crime, terroristic attacks (on a national or international scale), war, and large changes made over a short period of time. The negative mood created by these events will eventually find a way to be expressed. This crisis can also occur during periods of economic political uncertainty, which can lead to citizens becoming uncertain of and questioning their own identities or losing them altogether.  

New developments, processes, problems and events are often made sense of and contextualized by drawing from national memory.

Critical national memory 
Critical history or historic memory cuts from national memory's tradition centric to national heritage and orients itself towards a specialized study of history in a more sociological manner.

It has been proposed that the unthinkable ought not to be unmasked but that instead what made it thinkable should be reconstructed and that the difficulty of discussing the non-places or the bad places of national memory make it necessary to include forgetfulness and amnesia in the concept. The absence of belief in a shared past may be another factor. 

National memory may lead to questioning the nation as it is as well as its identity and imply a societal negotiation of what the country wishes to be as a nation. To understand the links between memory, forgetfulness, identity and the imaginary construction of the nation analysis of the discourse in the places of memory is fundamental as in all writings of national history an image of the nation is being restructured.

See also

References

Further reading 
 Les Lieux de Mémoire
 

Cultural studies
History
Memory
National identity